Harry Hudson may refer to:
 Harry Hudson (rugby league)
 Harry Hudson (musician)

See also
 Henry Hudson, English sea explorer and navigator